Dody Jane Dorn (born April 20, 1955) is an American film and sound editor. She is best known for working with director Christopher Nolan on several films including Memento (2000), for which she was nominated for an Academy Award.

Dorn has worked multiple times with director Ridley Scott as well as having edited SICK: The Life & Death of Bob Flanagan, Supermasochist, a documentary film which chronicles the life of a sadomasochistic man who struggles with cystic fibrosis.

Life and career
Dorn was born into a film industry family, her father having worked as a set designer and film producer. Dorn attended Hollywood High School and it was there that she decided to pursue a career as a math teacher. A fateful job working behind the scenes at a movie sound stage led her towards working in the film industry. Dorn appeared in two films as an actress (including a nude "Archbishop" in the 1976 satire TunnelVision) before moving behind the camera. She worked her way up the food chain (working as a production assistant, script supervisor, assistant location manager, and several other freelance jobs) eventually attaining the position of assistant film editor which she held until 1982. Finding it unusually difficult to move up to picture editing, Dorn made a lateral move to sound editing. Her work as a sound editor on James Cameron's The Abyss (1989) won the Golden Reel Award and was nominated for a best sound Academy Award.

In 1986, she started her own sound company, Sonic Kitchen, but with time, got more and more disenchanted and distracted with the daily business grind. Dorn had begun to lose interest and was compelled to get back to her passion—feature film picture editing. It was the editing of the documentary cult film SICK: The Life & Death of Bob Flanagan, Supermasochist and Memento which brought Dody Dorn's picture editing to the attention of the rest of the world. She has since continued to work with director Christopher Nolan on several films and has repeatedly worked with noted film director, Ridley Scott. In addition to her credited editing on Scott's films, Dorn worked on the 2003 DVD releases of Alien (the "Director's Cut"). Dorn was selected for membership in the American Cinema Editors.

Quotes
"It is still a commonly accepted notion that the editor just "cuts out all the bad bits." I liken editing more to sculpture. I don’t claim to be Michelangelo, but I like to think that when I am watching the dailies projected for the first time, I am seeing the pure essence of the film and that I work toward preserving and presenting that essence in a form that is accessible while still being artful."
"There is also a lot of trial and error in the editing room. Even if a director has a clear vision of what he wants, until the images are actually juxtaposed and the rhythm is defined by the editing, you never really know how it will work."
"I appreciate invisible editing, but it’s fun when editing can be conspicuous, provided it is adding to the narrative and not done for its own sake."
"Editing is making choices. During post-production, I work with the director to mine the best film out of the material that was shot. Leaving no stone unturned and going with my gut instincts, two seemingly diametrically opposed concepts, are techniques that I put to use on every film. That strange combination of hard work and divine inspiration probably means, inevitably, that I have left my stamp on the films I’ve edited."
"I see a finished film as a total product and I cannot separate (nor do I want to) the various aspects of the film. The images work in conjunction with the sound and the music and they need to be considered together, in just the same way that the rhythm and juxtaposition of the images need to be considered. I do use my experience in sound all the time. I work with temp sound and music in the AVID from day one. I may sometimes edit without sound for technical reasons, but putting sound in follows very close behind and will definitely affect how I evaluate what I have edited and will often stimulate changes."

Selected filmography

As film editor

As sound editor / assistant sound editor
Max Dugan Returns (1983) (assistant sound editor)
Class (1983) (sound editor)
The Big Chill (1983) (assistant sound editor) (uncredited)
Racing with the Moon (1984) (foley editor)
Silverado (1985) (foley editor)
Children of a Lesser God (1986) (sound editor)
The Big Easy (1987) (sound editor)
Tapeheads (1988) (supervising sound editor)
Powwow Highway (1989) (supervising sound editor)
The Abyss (1989) (supervising sound editor)
The Big Picture (1989) (supervising sound editor)
State of Grace (1990) (supervising sound editor)

Accolades
1990 The Abyss (won) Motion Picture Sound Editors MPSE Golden Reel Award Best Sound Editing - Sound Effects w/ co-editor Blake Leyh
2001 - Life with Judy Garland: Me and My Shadows (nominated) Emmy Award
2002 - Life with Judy Garland: Me and My Shadows (nominated) ACE Eddie Award Outstanding Single Camera Picture Editing for a Miniseries, Movie or a Special
2002 - Memento (nominated) Academy Award Best Editing
2002 - Memento (nominated) American Cinema Editors ACE Eddie Award Best Edited Feature Film - Dramatic
2002 - Memento (nominated) The American Film Institute AFI Film Award AFI Editor of the Year
2002 - Memento (nominated) Phoenix Film Critics Society Awards PFCS Award Best Film Editing
2002 - Memento (won) Las Vegas Film Critics Society Film Awards - Sierra Award Best Editing
2003 - Insomnia (nominated) Satellite Awards Golden Satellite Award Best Film Editing

In 2012, the Motion Picture Editors Guild listed Memento as the fourteenth best-edited film of all time based on a survey of its membership.

References

External links
 
 New York Times: "Dody Dorn: Film Editor" credits
 The Digital Review - Sick: The Life & Death of Bob Flanagan, Supermasochist - DVD Review

American film editors
American women film editors
1955 births
Living people
American Cinema Editors
People from Santa Monica, California
21st-century American women